The Single Brothers' House was built to house the Single Brethren, the unmarried men, of the Moravian Congregation of Salem, now Winston-Salem, North Carolina.  It is part of Old Salem Museums & Gardens and open as an Old Salem tour building to visitors.  It is located at 600 South Main Street, at Academy Street, on the southwest corner.

History
The first portion designed by Friedrich Wilhelm von Marschall, a leader of the Moravian settlements. The first section was constructed of traditional Germanic half-timber framing, exposed brick noggin, a clay tile roof, and had a pent eave. It was completed in 1769.  A later brick addition, was added in 1786, by master mason Johann Gottlob Krause to the south end. The building housed craftsmen and their apprentices, as well as provide individual trades shops.  The building had kitchen and dining room, administrative offices, and a Saal (worship/meeting area). Additional buildings were constructed on the large property that provided additional space for the activities such as the (reconstructed) 1771 Workshop building behind. There were also a brewery, slaughterhouse, distillery, and tannery on the parcel, as well as extensive gardens that have been partially restored. The Single Brothers House was closed in 1823, with the oldest part used as apartments and the brick addition as a Boys School. The school only stayed in the building for 6 years, after which the building was primarily residential and eventually became known as the "Widow's House" since there were mainly single women and widows of the congregation living in it. The Single Sisters later took control of the property and eventually it was leased as part of the museum and restored in 1964.

The building belongs to the Salem Congregation, a group of Moravian Churches that evolved from the original Congregational Council for Salem. The building is currently part of the tour for Old Salem Museums & Gardens.  During the Advent season, it is site of the Candle Tea, a fundraiser held by the Women's Fellowship of Home Moravian Church for local non-profit agencies.

It was listed as an individual National Historic Landmark in 1970, and is contributing resource of the Old Salem National Historic Landmark District designated in 1966 and updated in 2016.

Gallery

See also

List of the oldest buildings in North Carolina
List of National Historic Landmarks in North Carolina
National Register of Historic Places listings in Forsyth County, North Carolina

References

Further reading
 Old Salem: An Adventure in Historic Preservation, rev. ed. Frances Griffin. Old Salem Inc.: Winston-Salem, NC, 1985.
 Old Salem: Official Guidebook. Hunter James & Frances Griffin. Old Salem, Inc.: Winston-Salem, NC 1977–1994.
 Old Salem: The Official Guidebook. Penelope Niven & Cornelia Wright. Old Salem Inc.: Winston-Salem, NC, 2000.

External links
Old Salem Museum & Gardens: Single Brothers' House

Historic American Buildings Survey in North Carolina
Houses on the National Register of Historic Places in North Carolina
Moravian settlement in North Carolina
National Historic Landmarks in North Carolina
Houses in Winston-Salem, North Carolina
Historic house museums in North Carolina
Museums in Winston-Salem, North Carolina
Houses completed in 1769
National Register of Historic Places in Winston-Salem, North Carolina
Historic district contributing properties in North Carolina